Gunnar Nielsen (born 7 October 1986) is a Faroese professional footballer who last played as a goalkeeper for Icelandic club FH. Nielsen has also represented HB, Boldklubben Frem, Gøtu Ítróttarfelag, Blackburn Rovers, Manchester City, Wrexham, Tranmere Rovers, Silkeborg, Motherwell, Stjarnan and the Faroe Islands national football team at all age levels.

Club career

Born in Tórshavn, Nielsen was signed by Blackburn Rovers for a "small" but undisclosed fee on 2 July 2007 from BK Frem. Nielsen, who was on trial with Rovers in May, told the club website: "I am very pleased – it is a massive chance for me just to develop. I'm glad the manager and staff believe in me and I won't let them down." He transferred Motherwell of the Scottish Premier League on a six-month loan on 8 August 2008, before returning to Blackburn on 30 December 2008.

Nielsen signed for Manchester City on a two-and-a-half-year contract in 2009 and joined Conference National side Wrexham on loan shortly afterwards. He made his debut in a 1–0 defeat to Histon on 28 March. He was suspected to have sustained a thumb injury during a game against Oxford United in April, meaning he returned to City for a scan, which confirmed the suspected injury. Nielsen made his Premier League debut on 24 April 2010 as a substitute for injured Shay Given in the 76th minute during Manchester City's stalemate against Arsenal. As a result, he became the first Faroese footballer to play in the Premier League. In the summer of 2010, he signed a contract extension with Manchester City that ran until 2012.

On 23 July 2010 Nielsen joined League One team Tranmere Rovers on loan until January 2011. He made his debut for Tranmere in a 2–1 defeat by Oldham Athletic on 7 August, After picking up an injury on international duty, he spent over three months out, before returning to the first team at Tranmere in December 2010.

He was released by Man City at the end of the 2011–12 season.
However, weeks later he rejoined the Manchester City squad, but was again released by the club after signing former England international Richard Wright on transfer deadline day. He officially left the club on 7 December and told the Manchester City website he hopes to join a team in England or the Scandinavian Region in January 2013.

In early April 2013, Nielsen signed for Silkeborg of the Danish Superliga. Nielsen immediately debuted for the club on 8 April 2013, a 1–0 defeat to Aalborg.

On 3 July 2013, Nielsen signed a 2-year deal with  Motherwell where he had previously spent six months on loan in 2008. He left Motherwell on 4 March 2015, by mutual consent.

On 4 April 2015, Nielsen signed a one-year contract with the Icelandic club Stjarnan. He made his debut for them on 27 April, in an Icelandic Super Cup win over KR. At the end of the 2015 season, Nielsen was elected player of the year for Stjarnan both by the players and the management. On 28 October 2015, Nielsen signed a three-year contract with 2015 Icelandic champions FH.

International career
Nielsen made his international debut for the Faroe Islands after starting in a 2–1 win over Iceland on 22 March 2009.

On 3 June 2016, he captained the team for the first time in a 2–0 friendly defeat against Kosovo in Frankfurt.

Honours 
FH

 Úrvalsdeild: 2016

Stjarnan

 Icelandic Super Cup: 2015

Career statistics

References

External links

 
 
 
 
 Boldklubben Frem profile  
 Faroesoccer.com – see Landsdystir (statistics regarding the Faroe Islands national team)

1986 births
Living people
People from Tórshavn
Faroese footballers
Faroe Islands international footballers
Faroese expatriate sportspeople in Scotland
Association football goalkeepers
Havnar Bóltfelag players
Boldklubben Frem players
Blackburn Rovers F.C. players
Motherwell F.C. players
Manchester City F.C. players
Wrexham A.F.C. players
Tranmere Rovers F.C. players
Premier League players
English Football League players
Scottish Professional Football League players
National League (English football) players
Faroese expatriate footballers
Expatriate footballers in England
Expatriate footballers in Scotland
Faroe Islands under-21 international footballers
Fimleikafélag Hafnarfjarðar players
Stjarnan players
Expatriate footballers in Iceland
Úrvalsdeild karla (football) players
Faroe Islands youth international footballers
Faroese expatriate sportspeople in England
Faroese expatriate sportspeople in Wales
Faroese expatriate sportspeople in Iceland